Vladimír Majdan (born 7 April 1999) is a professional Slovak footballer who plays as a defender for FK Pohronie, on loan from FC Košice.

Club career

MŠK Žilina
Majdan made his Fortuna Liga debut for Žilina against Spartak Trnava on 16 February 2019. The game concluded in a 1–1 tie. He played 90 minutes of the match.

FC Košice
In June 2022, Majdan was signed to Košice by Anton Šoltis, who managed him during his loan spell in Senica.

References

External links
 MŠK Žilina official club profile 
 
 Futbalnet profile 
 

1999 births
Living people
Sportspeople from Žilina
Slovak footballers
Slovakia youth international footballers
Association football defenders
MŠK Žilina players
FK Senica players
MŠK Púchov players
FC Košice (2018) players
FK Pohronie players
2. Liga (Slovakia) players
Slovak Super Liga players